Serena Williams was the defending champion, but withdrew due to an elbow injury.

Angelique Kerber won the title, defeating Karolína Plíšková in the final, 6–3, 5–7, 6–4.

Seeds
The top four seeds received a bye into the second round.

Draw

Finals

Top half

Bottom half

Qualifying

Seeds

Qualifiers

Draw

First qualifier

Second qualifier

Third qualifier

Fourth qualifier

External links
 WTA tournament draws

Bank of the West Classic - Singles
2015 Singles